

Champions

Major League Baseball
 World Series: Chicago White Sox over New York Giants (4-2)

Awards
 MLB Most Valuable Player Award
 None

MLB statistical leaders

Major league baseball final standings

American League final standings

National League final standings

Events

 April 11 – At the Polo Grounds, Babe Ruth of the Boston Red Sox pitches a three-hitter in shutting down the New York Yankees on Opening Day, 1–0. Ruth's performance marks the start of good things to come. He will win 24 games this year, while leading the American League with 35 complete games.
 April 14 – Eddie Cicotte of the Chicago White Sox tosses a no-hitter in an 11–0 victory over the St. Louis Browns.
 April 24 – George Mogridge pitches a no-hitter for the New York Yankees in a 2–1 win over the Boston Red Sox.
 May 2 – In one of the most outstanding pitching duel's in baseball history, Cincinnati Reds pitcher Fred Toney tosses a 10-inning no-hitter in a 1–0 win over the Chicago Cubs. Opposing pitcher Hippo Vaughn did not surrender a hit until a one-out single in the 10th inning.
 May 5 – Ernie Koob pitches a no-hitter to lead the St. Louis Browns to a 1–0 victory over the Chicago White Sox.
 May 6 – Bob Groom of the St. Louis Browns duplicates teammate Ernie Koob's feat of the previous day by pitching a 3–0 no-hitter against the Chicago White Sox in the second game of a doubleheader at Sportsman's Park.
May 7 – Babe Ruth pitches a shutout and drives in the game's only run on a sacrifice fly as the Red Sox top Walter Johnson and the Senators, 1-0.
 June 23 – Ernie Shore of the Boston Red Sox pitched the most notable game of his career leading his team to a 4–0 win against the Washington Senators. Babe Ruth started the game for Boston but walked the leadoff hitter, Ray Morgan. Ruth then engaged in a heated argument with home plate umpire, Brick Owens, who tossed Ruth out of the game. Then Shore came into the game to relieve Ruth. Morgan was caught stealing, and Shore retired the next 26 Senators he faced. At the time, Shore was credited with a perfect game, but since then, the criteria have been revised, and Shore's name has been removed from the record books, although he still gets credit for a combined no-hitter.
 July 6 – The Chicago White Sox put a stop to Ty Cobb's consecutive-game hitting streak, halting it at 35.
 July 15 – Boston Braves catcher Hank Gowdy reports for duty with the Ohio National Guard becoming the first Major League player to enlist for service during World War I.
August 28 – The Indians' pennant chances suffer a severe blow when outfielder Tris Speaker is suspended after an argument with an umpire.
 October 15 – The Chicago White Sox defeat the New York Giants, 4–2, in Game 6 of the World Series to capture their second World Championship, four games to two. The White Sox were essentially dismantled following the  season by baseball commissioner Kenesaw Mountain Landis due to the Black Sox Scandal in the 1919 Series. The team would not win another World Series for the next 88 years.

Births

January
January 9 – Johnny Echols
January 13 – Stan Wentzel
January 15 – Johnny Rucker
January 16 – Bob Ramazzotti
January 17 – Jocko Thompson
January 20 – Joe Dobson
January 22 – Huck Geary
January 23 – Sam Jethroe
January 24 – Danny Doyle
January 24 – Wally Judnich
January 25 – Carl McNabb
January 30 – Mickey Harris
January 30 – Al Veigel

February
February 1 – Elmer Burkart
February 1 – Eiji Sawamura
February 9 – Moon Mullen
February 10 – Roy Bruner
February 10 – Allie Reynolds
February 10 – Eddie Turchin
February 12 – Dom DiMaggio
February 14 – Augie Bergamo
February 17 – Ed Chandler
February 19 – Chuck Aleno
February 19 – Tom Earley
February 20 – Jack Bolling
February 26 – Johnny Grodzicki
February 27 – Rube Melton

March
March 1 – Rankin Johnson
March 1 – Ike Pearson
March 2 – Jim Konstanty
March 4 – Clyde McCullough
March 5 – Alex Monchak
March 6 – Walker Cress
March 6 – Joe Orrell
March 8 – Bill Salkeld
March 13 – Joe Walsh
March 15 – Charlie Bowles
March 17 – Hank Sauer
March 18 – Ace Williams
March 24 – Dave Bartosch
March 26 – Clayton Lambert
March 29 – Tommy Holmes

April
April 1 – Chet Ross
April 2 – Vedie Himsl
April 11 – Barney McCosky
April 11 – Luis Romero Petit
April 13 – Jim Schelle
April 14 – Marvin Miller
April 15 – Elmer Gedeon
April 17 – Stan Andrews
April 18 – Ty LaForest
April 18 – Nick Polly
April 18 – Vince Ventura
April 20 – Hal Peck
April 23 – Tony Lupien
April 23 – Gene Smith
April 25 – John Dagenhard
April 26 – Sal Maglie
April 26 – Virgil Trucks
April 29 – Bob Whitcher

May
May 1 – Johnny Berardino
May 1 – Tommy Nelson
May 3 – José Del Vecchio
May 5 – George Dockins
May 5 – Lennie Merullo
May 6 – Mike McCormick
May 7 – Al Papai
May 8 – Harry O'Neill
May 10 – Chet Clemens
May 11 – Johnny Gerlach
May 11 – Dave Short
May 13 – Carden Gillenwater
May 13 – Lou Stringer
May 14 – Bob Thurman
May 16 – George Jumonville
May 19 – Skippy Roberge
May 22 – Frankie Austin
May 25 – Bert Hodges

June
June 7 – Junior Thompson
June 10 – Earl Henry
June 14 – Ray Hoffman
June 14 – Hal Manders
June 18 – Jimmy Pofahl
June 23 – Bubba Floyd
June 23 – Jack Sanford
June 24 – Al Gerheauser
June 27 – Ethel Boyce
June 30 – Willie Grace

July
July 3 – Piper Davis
July 4 – Mike Palagyi
July 5 – Tommy Warren
July 6 – Ken Sears
July 10 – Hugh Alexander
July 15 – Barney Longest
July 17 – Lou Boudreau
July 18 – Leo Wells
July 21 – Mitch Chetkovich
July 22 – Phil McCullough
July 23 – Ray Scarborough
July 26 – Jimmy Bloodworth
July 27 – Bill Sayles
July 29 – Buck Frierson

August
August 1 – Chet Johnson
August 3 – Milo Candini
August 6 – John McGillen
August 8 – Ken Raffensberger
August 11 – Lefty Hoerst
August 13 – Sid Gordon
August 19 – Jim Honochick
August 21 – Kay Heim
August 23 – Jim Prendergast
August 26 – George Barnicle
August 26 – Dorothy Damaschke
August 26 – Mike Naymick
August 27 – Peanuts Lowrey
August 30 – Red Embree
August 31 – Frank Dasso

September
September 1 – Paul Campbell
September 3 – Frank Jelincich
September 7 – Roy Partee
September 12 – Russ Christopher
September 14 – John Douglas
September 17 – Antonio Briñez
September 17 – Al Gettel
September 21 – Joe Haynes
September 22 – Anse Moore
September 24 – Charlie Cuellar
September 25 – Phil Rizzuto
September 25 – Johnny Sain
September 26 – Thurman Tucker
September 28 – Roy Lee
September 28 – Glen Moulder
September 28 – Mike Ulicny
September 29 – Eddie Feinberg

October
October 3 – Frank Kalin
October 4 – Hal Quick
October 6 – Paul Calvert
October 8 – Danny Murtaugh
October 8 – Hal Toenes
October 11 – Vince Castino
October 12 – Ray Murray
October 17 – Johnny Ostrowski
October 18 – Loy Hanning
October 21 – Frank Papish
October 21 – Bob Prichard
October 25 – Lee MacPhail
October 27 – Bob Patrick
October 28 – Joe Page
October 30 – Bobby Bragan

November
November 1 – Pat Mullin
November 3 – Len Gilmore
November 3 – Eli Hodkey
November 3 – Marguerite Jones
November 6 – Bob Repass
November 7 – Kathryn Beare
November 9 – Bob Neighbors
November 11 – Pat Scantlebury
November 16 – Ed Busch
November 20 – Jess Dobernic
November 20 – Felix Mackiewicz
November 20 – Mike Schemer
November 23 – Jake Caulfield
November 23 – Herman Reich
November 25 – Len Perme
November 26 – Pat Cooper
November 26 – Mike Kosman

December
December 1 – Marty Marion
December 9 – George Woodend
December 10 – Andy Tomasic
December 12 – Bob Carpenter
December 12 – Clyde Kluttz
December 16 – Jim Pruett
December 18 – Margaret Stefani
December 19 – Ray Poat
December 27 – Herb Karpel

Deaths

January–March
January 3 – Rynie Wolters, 74, Dutch pitcher and outfielder who hit .318 and posted a 19-23 record with the New York Mutuals, Cleveland Forest Citys and Elizabeth Resolutes between 1871 and 1873.
January 10 – Jack McFetridge, 47,  pitcher who played in 1890 and 1903 with the Philadelphia Phillies of the National League.
January 13 – Jim Garry, 47, pitcher for the 1893 Boston Beaneaters.
January 16 – Charlie Geggus, 54, pitcher who posted a 10-9 record and a 2.54 ERA for the 1884 Washington Nationals of the Union Association.
January 17 – Pat McCauley, 46, backup catcher who played between 1893 and 1903 for the St. Louis Browns, Washington Senators and New York Highlanders.
January 19 – Charlie Enwright, 29, shortstop who played for the 1909 St. Louis Cardinals.
January 26 – Jim McGuire, 41, shortstop for the 1901 Cleveland Blues of the American League.
January 30 – Cyclone Ryan, 51, Irish pitcher and first baseman who played for the 1887 New York Metropolitans and the 1891 Boston Beaneaters.
January 31 – Pete O'Brien, 39, second baseman for the  Cincinnati Reds, St. Louis Browns, Cleveland Naps and Washington Senators between 1901 and 1907.
February 7 – Tim Murnane, 64,  first baseman and center fielder in the early years of professional baseball who became president of the New England League and went on to a distinguished tenure as sports editor of The Boston Globe for over 30 years, serving as one of the sport's leading advocates.
February 18 – Charlie Fisher, 64, third baseman who played for the Kansas City Cowboys and the Chicago Browns of the Union Association in the 1884 season.
February 18 – William Kerr, 69, co-owner of the Pittsburgh Pirates (1893–1900).
February 23 – Art Weaver, 37, catcher and infielder who played with the Cardinals, Pirates, Browns and White Sox between 1902 and 1908.
February 28 – Parson Nicholson, 53, second baseman who played for the Detroit Wolverines, Toledo Maumees and Washington Senators between 1888 and 1895.
March 4 – Joe Dowie, 51, backup outfielder for the 1889 Baltimore Orioles of the National League.
March 9 – Cooney Snyder, 45, Canadian catcher who played for the 1898 Louisville Colonels.
March 15 – John Munce, 69, outfielder for the 1884 Wilmington Quicksteps of the Union Association.
March 27 – Willie Jensen, 27, American League pitcher who played for the 1912 Detroit Tigers and the 1914 Philadelphia Athletics.

April–June
April 5 – Frank McLaughlin, 60, utility infielder and outfielder who played from 1882 through 1884 for five teams in three different leagues.
April 9 – Charlie Gould, 69, first baseman  for the original Cincinnati Red Stockings of 1869 and 1870, the first team consisting entirely of professional players.
May 19 – Pat McManus, 54, who pitched for the Indianapolis Hoosiers (1889) and Philadelphia Phillies (1894) of the National League.
May 25 – Willie Sudhoff, 42, pitcher for six different teams from 1897 to 1906, who became the first to play for all St. Louis clubs both in the National and American leagues.
May 27 – Tom Ford, 50, American Association pitcher and shortstop for the Columbus Solons and the Brooklyn Gladiators during the 1890 season.
June 10 – Jack Fanning, 54, pitcher for the 1889 Indianapolis Hoosiers and 1894 Philadelphia Phillies.

July–September
July 1 – Al Buckenberger, 56, manager for four teams between 1889 and 1904, mainly for the Pittsburgh Pirates and the Boston Beaneaters of the National League.
July 1 – Henry Mathewson, 30, pitcher for the National League New York Giants in the 1906 and 1907 seasons.
July 16 – Dick Butler, 47, backup catcher for the 1897 Louisville Colonels and the 1899 Washington Senators.
July 27 – John Schappert, [?], who pitched for the St. Louis Brown Stockings of the American Association in the 1882 season.
July 28 – Whitey Ritterson, 62, catcher for the 1876 Philadelphia Athletics.
August 7 – Bill Loughran, 55, catcher for the 1884 New York Gothams of the National League.
August 24 – Al McCauley, 54, first baseman and pitcher for the Indianapolis Hoosiers, Philadelphia Phillies and Washington Statesmen between the 1884 and 1891 seasons.
August 27 – Cy Alberts, 35, pitcher for the 1910 St. Louis Cardinals.
September 13 – Gene Derby, 57, catcher for the 1885 Baltimore Orioles of the American Association.

October–December
October 12 – Bill Clay, 42, backup outfielder for the 1902 Philadelphia Phillies.
November 1 – Steve Brady, 66, outfielder who played between 1874 and 1886 for the Hartford Dark Blues, Washington Nationals and New York Metropolitans.
November 19 – King Bailey, 47, pitcher for the 1895 Cincinnati Reds.
December 2 – Mike Hooper, 67, National Association outfielder for the Baltimore Marylands between 1868 and 1873, who led his team in runs scored from 1868 to 1870.
December 17 – Frank Burlingame, 64, National League and Union Association umpire
December 20 – Will Calihan, 48, American Association pitcher who played from 1890 to 1891 with the Rochester Broncos and Philadelphia Athletics.